Dehalogenimonas alkenigignens is a strictly anaerobic bacterium from the genus of Dehalogenimonas which has been isolated from groundwater from Louisiana in the United States.

References

External links
Type strain of Dehalogenimonas alkenigignens at BacDive -  the Bacterial Diversity Metadatabase

 

Bacteria described in 2013
Dehalococcoidetes